William Johnston (1819May 1, 1866) was an American lawyer and politician who served one term as a U.S. Representative from Ohio from 1863 to 1865.

Biography 
Born on the island of Ireland (the entirety of which was then part of the U.K.) in 1819, Johnston immigrated to the United States and settled in Ohio.
He attended the public schools.
He studied law.
He was admitted to the bar and practiced in Mansfield, Ohio, from 1859 to 1863.

Johnston was elected as a Democrat to the Thirty-eighth Congress (March 4, 1863 – March 3, 1865).
He was an unsuccessful candidate for reelection in 1864 to the Thirty-ninth Congress.
He resumed the practice of law.

Death
He died in Mansfield, Ohio, May 1, 1866.
He was interred in Mansfield Cemetery.

Sources

1819 births
1866 deaths
Politicians from Mansfield, Ohio
Ohio lawyers
Irish emigrants to the United States (before 1923)
19th-century American politicians
19th-century American lawyers
Democratic Party members of the United States House of Representatives from Ohio